Henry of Saxe-Römhild (19 November 1650 – 13 May 1710) was a duke of Saxe-Römhild.

Life 
He was born in Gotha, as the seventh but fourth surviving son of Ernest I the Pious of Saxe-Gotha and Elisabeth Sophie of Saxe-Altenburg.  After the death of their father, in 1675, Henry and his brothers co-ruled the duchy of Saxe-Gotha-Altenburg.  On 24 February 1680, after the treaty of division of the family lands with his brothers, he received Saxe-Römhild, which consisted of the cities of Römhild, Königsberg (now in Bavaria), Themar, Behrungen and Milz and the fiefdom of Echter.

In Darmstadt on 1 March 1676, Henry married Marie Elisabeth of Hesse-Darmstadt, daughter of Louis VI of Hesse-Darmstadt.  They had no children.

From 18 November 1680 Henry and his young wife Marielies lived in what they called Glücksburg castle in Römhild.  Duke Henry unfolded brisk construction activity.  He had his castle remodeled and rebuilt according to his wishes.  During his rule the castle church was built, and a customs house, and four houses for the court nobility, plus a riding school, a race track and the Orangerie.  Among the more magnificent structures were a cave house named Marie Elizabeth Delight, named after his wife, whom he loved very much, and a pleasure palace in Mertzelbach, designed by the court sculptor Lux, who also created the high altar in the Abbey Church.   Many of these buildings no longer exist, but Henry described them in detail in his book The Princely desire to build of Duke Henry of Saxe-Römhild, which he published himself.  This book is considered one of the few remaining contemporary testimonies on ephemeral architecture.  Henry also had lake Bürgersee drained and converted it into a pleasure garden.  He equipped the city church with a Baroque high altar, an ornate royal box and a new organ.

Henry was knowledgeable in mechanics, architecture and mathematics.  He  maintained  a princely library at Schloss Glücksburg, which he expanded steadily.  After Henry's death, it was inherited by the Duke of Saxe-Gotha.

From 1691 to 1693 he had been regent for Duke Frederick II of Saxe-Gotha, together with his brother Bernhard.  Henry entered into imperial military service when he was young and became imperial Generalfeldzeugmeister in 1697.  In 1698, he received the Order of the Elephant.  In his last four years he was the senior member of the Ernestine house.

The luxurious life at court and the court of the duke's representative brought the small country town of Römhild to economic recovery and cultural prosperity.  The expenditure exceeded the financial strength of the Duke by far.  When the popular ruler died unexpectedly in 1710, he left behind significant debts.  His inheritance was auctioned.

Henry died at Römhild.  After his death, his lands were disputed between his brothers. Eventually, Römhild was retained by his younger brother, John Ernest.  Duke Henry was buried in the Altar Hall of Römhild church.  Today, there is no inscription and no more grave marker.

His marriage was childless and Ernestine sideline of Römhild died out with his death.  The Principality was divided in the Coburg-Eisenberg-Römhild inheritance dispute, which was settled in 1735.

Ancestors

References
 Association for History and Geography of Saxe-Meiningen, Neue Landeskunde des Herzogtums Sachsen-Meiningen, Hildburghausen 1903.
 August B. Michaelis: Einleitung zu einer volständigen Geschichte der Chur- und Fürstlichen Häuser ..., p. 521.
 Johann Samuel Ersch: Allgemeine Encyclopädie der Wissenschaften und Künste in alphabetischer ..., p. 358.

1650 births
1710 deaths
Dukes of Saxe-Römhild
Generals of the Holy Roman Empire